Venus is a genus of small to large saltwater clams in the family Veneridae, which is sometimes known as the Venus clams and their relatives. These are marine bivalve molluscs.

Etymology
The genus Venus is named after Venus, the Roman goddess of love and sexuality.

Taxonomy
However, some bivalves are still called Venus clams because they used to be in the genus Venus,  though they are now placed in other genera: these include the species within the genus Mercenaria, and Pitar dione, the Venus shell described in sexual terms by Linnaeus.

Fossil records
The genus is known from the Cretaceous to the recent periods (age range: from 136.4 Mya to now). Fossils shells have been found all over the world. About 20 extinct species are known.

The family Veneridae
The family Veneridae contains over 400 known species, many of which are attractive and popular with shell-collectors.

The shells of venerids vary in shape, and include shells that are circular, triangular, and rectangular. Characteristically, Venus clams possess a porcelain-like inner shell layer, a complex tooth structure in the hinge, well-developed escutcheon and lunule, and a well-developed pallial sinus.

Veneridae colonize the sandy ocean bottom, and their populations are often dense and large. The Veneroida order typically has a folded gill structure which is well developed for filtering out small food particles.

Common name

The common names of clams in this genus often include the name Venus. A few species that still have "Venus" as part of their common name, but which are no longer in the genus Venus are:
 Sunray Venus, Macrocallista nimbosa (Lightfoot)
 Cross-barred Venus, Chione cancellata (Linnaeus)
 Lady-in-waiting Venus, Chione intapurpurea (Conrad)
 Imperial Venus, Lirophora latilirata (Conrad)
 Grey pygmy Venus, Chione grus (Holmes)
 Striped Venus clam, Chamelea gallina (Linnaeus, 1758)
 Elegant Venus clam, Pitar dione (Linnaeus, 1758)

Species

The genus Venus contains these extant species:
Venus albina G. B. Sowerby II, 1853
Venus casina Linnaeus, 1758
Venus cassinaeformis (Yokoyama, 1926)
Venus chevreuxi Dautzenberg, 1891
Venus crebrisulca Lamarck, 1818
Venus declivis G. B. Sowerby II, 1853
Venus lyra Hanley, 1845
Venus nux Gmelin, 1791
Venus rosalina Rang, 1802: synonym of Venus crebrisulca Lamarck, 1818
Venus subrosalina Tomlin, 1923
Venus thomassini Fischer-Piette & Vukadinovic, 1977
Venus verdensis Dautzenberg & H. Fischer, 1906
Venus verrucosa Linnaeus, 1758

References

External links
 Veneridae, Venus clams
 Veneridae, Venus clam
 Venus, Veneridae
 AMNH Veneridae holdings
 NC Sea Grant Seashells of NC Field Guide
 NC Seashells

Veneridae
Bivalve genera
Taxa named by Carl Linnaeus
Extant Valanginian first appearances